East Flat Rock is an unincorporated area and census-designated place (CDP) in Henderson County, North Carolina, United States. The population was 4,995 at the 2010 census, up from 4,151 at the 2000 census. It is part of the Asheville Metropolitan Statistical Area.

Geography
East Flat Rock is located in southeastern Henderson County at  (35.284583, -82.419013). It is bordered to the west by the village of Flat Rock and to the northwest by unincorporated Barker Heights.

U.S. Route 176 (Spartanburg Highway) is the main road through East Flat Rock, leading northwest  to Hendersonville, the county seat, and southeast  to Saluda. Interstate 26 runs along the eastern edge of the community, with access from Exit 53 (Upward Road). I-26 leads north  to Asheville and southeast  to Spartanburg, South Carolina.

Demographics

2020 census

As of the 2020 United States census, there were 5,757 people, 2,057 households, and 1,322 families residing in the CDP.

2000 census
As of the census of 2000, there were 4,151 people, 1,647 households, and 1,133 families residing in the CDP. The population density was 1,279.1 people per square mile (493.1/km2). There were 1,823 housing units at an average density of 561.7 per square mile (216.6/km2). The racial makeup of the CDP was 85.69% White, 3.08% African American, 0.31% Native American, 0.29% Asian, 8.79% from other races, and 1.83% from two or more races. Hispanic or Latino of any race were 14.96% of the population.

There were 1,647 households, out of which 31.6% had children under the age of 18 living with them, 49.1% were married couples living together, 13.7% had a female householder with no husband present, and 31.2% were non-families. 26.0% of all households were made up of individuals, and 10.9% had someone living alone who was 65 years of age or older. The average household size was 2.49 and the average family size was 2.95.

In the CDP, the population was spread out, with 24.4% under the age of 18, 10.8% from 18 to 24, 30.6% from 25 to 44, 20.3% from 45 to 64, and 13.9% who were 65 years of age or older. The median age was 34 years. For every 100 females, there were 98.2 males. For every 100 females age 18 and over, there were 96.5 males.

The median income for a household in the CDP was $29,315, and the median income for a family was $31,286. Males had a median income of $22,500 versus $19,907 for females. The per capita income for the CDP was $13,723. About 14.0% of families and 20.6% of the population were below the poverty line, including 33.6% of those under age 18 and 15.4% of those age 65 or over.

References

Census-designated places in Henderson County, North Carolina
Census-designated places in North Carolina
Asheville metropolitan area